Awake is the fifth studio album (twenty-seventh album overall) by Australian worship group Hillsong Worship, released on 11 October 2019. It is the group's first studio album in 15 years, with the last being Faithful (2004). The album was preceded by the lead single "King of Kings", released on 12 July 2019. On 19 June 2020, "Awake My Soul" was released as the second single, which features Tasha Cobbs Leonard; it is the group's first collaboration since 2004. The album won the Worship Album of the Year at the 51st Dove Awards.

Background
The album was recorded over the course of six months at both a studio in Orange County, California and in Sydney, Australia. Worship leader and co-producer Brooke Ligertwood revealed that recording at the Orange County studio was interrupted by "multiple mishaps with storms causing power outages and all kinds of crazy little discomforts", going on to say that she was a "touch traumatized" from the experience.

Critical reception

Herb Longs of The Christian Beat described the album as "refreshing", writing that it features "expertly written lyrics with a variety of arrangements create massive anthems, personal prayers and everything in between" and "prominent musical and lyrical elements of renewal and revival". Writing for Jesus Freak Hideout, Josh Balogh stated that the album "might just be the most complete Hillsong Worship album in years. It has a crisply produced, cohesive approach, and enough diversity of worship leader and tone to go along with praiseworthy lyrics and contemporary musicality." Balogh ultimately called it "one of the best overall worship albums of the year".

In awarding the album the Worship Album of the Year, Kevin Davis of New Release Today, says that the album "is loaded with stellar vocals, catchy melodies and solid lyrics reflecting unashamed faith in Jesus" and "is loaded with several stirring new worship songs that really set me in the proper mindset to praise God for loving me so much that He gave His life away for all that was lost."

Accolades

Track listing

Charts

Weekly charts

Year-end charts

References

2019 albums
Hillsong Music albums
Contemporary worship music albums